Iraqi Refugee Camp ( – Ardūgāh Avārgān-e ʿArāqī) is a village and refugee camp in Melkari Rural District, Vazineh District, Sardasht County, West Azerbaijan Province, Iran. At the 2006 census, its population was 127, in 25 families.

References 

Populated places in Sardasht County